Alyans or Alliance is a Soviet and Russian rock band formed in 1981 by Igor Zhuravlev, Kostya Gavrilov, Oleg Parastayev and Andrey Tumanov. The band is best known for the 1987 single "Na zare".

History

Early years (1981–1984)
Alyans was formed in 1981 in Moscow at the initiative of guitarist Sergei Volodin. The group initially included Igor Zhuravlev on vocals and guitar, Andrey Tumanov on bass, and Vladimir Ryabov on drums. The group's formation coincided with the beginning of the new wave movement in the Soviet Union. At this time, Alyans played ska and reggae as well as cover versions of Debbie Harry, The Police, The B-52s.

At the end of 1982, sound engineer Igor Zamaraev heard Alyans at the rock festival "Fiztekh - 1982" in Dolgoprudny and suggested recording an album. The band's first album, Kukla, was recorded in 1983 with Zamaraev's assistance. This album contains initial versions of later hits that were re-recorded and included on the 1984 albumYa medlenno uchilsya zhit'. At the same festival, the members of Alyans met the artistic director of the Kostroma Philharmonic, who offered them professional work. A couple of weeks later, Alyans left for Kostroma, with a line-up of Igor Zhuravlev (guitar, vocals), Andrey Tumanov (bass), Sergey Volodin (guitar) and Pavel Chinyakov (drums). The group went on tour under the name Kudesniki, since the philharmonic's warehouse had unused posters from another group called Kudesniki, which had broken up several months prior to the tour. During the tour, the group performed the songs that they had performed at the festival at the Moscow Institute of Physics and Technology. After concerts in the town of Buy, a commission from Moscow removed Alyans from the tour, citing “the lack of effectiveness of the program”. A deal with Kostroma Philharmonic was continued but 83' Spring tour was cancelled due to Volodin busyness. In the fall of 1984, the group was included in a list of bands prohibited from performing live. As a result of being blacklisted, Alyans was disbanded.

Reformation (1986–1993)
In the fall of 1986, the group appeared in public at the Forum of Creative Youth in the Metelitsa cafe, after which it entered the Moscow Rock Laboratory. Its composition: Igor Zhuravlev (vocals, guitar), Oleg Parastaev (keys), Andrey Tumanov (bass) and Konstantin Gavrilov (keys, programming). In February 1987, Alyans became the laureate of the first rock laboratory “Festival of Hopes”. The group performed songs such as “Na Zare”, “Get a Fire”, and “False Start”. The band participated in "Rock-panorama-87" festival and began to work with "SPM Record" label and with Stas Namin.

The band composed of Zhuravlev and Parastaev lasted until 1988, when it broke up due Zhuravlev deciding to radically change the sound of the band to rock music, which Parastaev, who planned to continue working in the spirit of the “new wave”, opposed and left the band, collecting his own project “New Russian Group” a.k.a “NRG”). Soon, drummer Yuri Kistenev joined the group, which completed the transformation of Alyans into a rock group. A year later, Sergey Kalachev replaced Andrei Tumanov on bass.

In 1990, "Alyans" performs at Luzhniki Stadium along with Kino, Bioconstructor, Joanna Stingray and Lyube. and tours across the Europe Later the singer Inna Zhelannaya joined the group. Together, they made several concert programs (participating in "Clear Water Rock" festival) and recorded the album "Made in White". Alyans at that time comprised: Zhuravlev, Maxim Trefan (keyboards, ex - “Polite Refusal”), Yuri “Khen” Kistenev (drums), Konstantin “Castello” Baranov (guitar, ex - “Nikolai Copernicus”), Sergey “Grebstel” Kalachev (bass), Vladimir “Miss” Missarzhevsky (percussion, ex - “Meeting On the Elbe”). Additionally, two musicians who owned ancient folk instruments, Sergey Starostin and Sergey Klevensky, participated in a creative search.

In 1992, Zhelannaya left the stage for some time due to the birth of her son. Then Kistenev went to the "Code of Ethics." Some of the musicians formed the Miss group, in which Missarzhevsky, who became the vocalist, wrote the words and music. The group played experimental music - a mixture of guitar rock and hard funk with rap elements; all songs were in English. The premiere of "Miss" was held in October 1992 at the Gorbunov Palace of Culture. In 1993, the group starred in the program “Program A” and recorded the only album “It's Up To You” (Moroz Records). The band's most famous song is “Sex in the future”.

In 1993, the record “Made in White” at the MIDEM-93 competition in France was named by European producers the best record in Europe in the style of “world music” of this year. Alyans by that time no longer existed, but was reassembled for a festive tour of Europe.

Reunions (1994–2008)
In January 1994, Alliance musicians formed the Farlanders group, led by Inna Zhelannaya, which included Yuri "Khen" Kistenev (drums), Sergey "Grebstel" Kalachev (bass), as well as Sergey Starostin and Sergey Klevensky.

Since 1990, Sergei Volodin and Andrey Tumanov experimented on their own project, and in 1994 they tried to recreate Alyans. They were joined by the former trumpeter of the “Brigade S” Yevgeny Korotkov as a keyboard player, and in 1996, drummer Dmitry Frolov, who graduated from the Gnessin School, came. The new Alliance performed big beats in the style of the 1960s. However, this project has not received development.

In 2000, Igor Zhuravlev with new songs appeared in the project of Katya Bocharova "ER-200".

Modern age (2008–present)
From 2008, Alyans regularly gave concerts in Moscow clubs, sometimes in different compositions, based on Igor Zhuravlev and Andrey Tumanov.

In 2018, the ex-keyboardist of the group Oleg Parastaev created a channel on YouTube. In April 2019, Parastaev published a video for the song “At Dawn,” filmed in 1987 which became a viral. In the same month, the album “Wanna Fly!” was released, which was the first release of the team in the last 25 years. Music videos for every album track were released.

On 14 February 2020, the group released the album "Space Dreams" with music videos for "Space Dreams" and "Hey, Man, Superman".

On 20 June 2020, Oleg Parastaev died at the age of 61.

Discography

See also 
 Music of the Soviet Union

References

External links 
 Official page on Bandcamp
Alyans on Discogs
 

Soviet rock music groups
Russian rock music groups
1980s in music
Musical groups from Moscow
Russian new wave musical groups